Moreuil station (French: Gare de Moreuil) is a railway station located in the commune of Moreuil in the Somme department, France.  The station is served by TER Hauts-de-France trains (Amiens - Compiègne line).

The station
The station was renovated and made accessible to the handicapped in 2003.

Together with Montdidier and Estrées-Saint-Denis, it is one of three points at which trains can pass each other along the line, which was reduced to single-track in the 1980s.

The station has a bicycle shed.

The station's goods facilities, which were formerly important, are no longer connected to the line but remain the property of the SNCF.

Gallery

See also
List of SNCF stations in Hauts-de-France

References

Railway stations in Somme (department)
Railway stations in France opened in 1883